The Cathedral Hill (Wzgórze Katedralne) in Frombork, Poland is a Middle Ages historical monument site.

Its major monuments include:
Archcathedral Basilica of the Assumption of the Blessed Virgin Mary and Saint Andrew (built in 1329-1388). Among other historical objects, it includes Nicolaus Copernicus epitaph and grave (reburied)
Bishop's palace
 Radziejowski Tower (Wieża Radziejowskiego)
Copernicus Tower
Southern Gate
Canonries

References

Monuments and memorials in Poland